"World in Your Hands" is a song by German Eurodance group Culture Beat, released in March 1994 as the fourth single and the last one marketed in almost all countries in Europe from their second album, Serenity (1993). As for other Culture Beat's singles, a CD maxi entirely composed of remixes was added among the available media a short time after. The ballad is written by Nosie Katzmann with Jay Supreme, Torsten Fenslau and Peter Zweie. It was a top-10 hit in Finland and the Netherlands. In the United Kingdom, it peaked at number 20.

Critical reception
AllMusic editor William Cooper complimented the song as "competent and entertaining". In his weekly UK chart commentary, James Masterton said, "Just when it seemed Culture Beat records could not get any faster they suddenly release a slow one." Alan Jones from Music Week commented, "After a trio of big hits, it is becoming obvious that Culture Beat aren't going to disappear overnight. And this is actually a more stylish and better-written song than some of their tunes, but it will probably meet with more resistance too as it is less obvious "in your face". Basically, it is a sweet ballad, but one which has been submerged beneath heavy percussion and bass elements and, like all the group's songs, it comes with a leaden rap." In an retrospective review, Pop Rescue remarked that it lets singer Tania Evans' vocals "to really shine", adding that "at times, her vocals remind me of Neneh Cherry, and it’s actually a really nice track". Sylvia Patterson from Smash Hits gave it two out of five, writing, "They are the new Snap! and to prove it they're here with a song just like all the others except it's got that "sinister" moody synth and underwater piano."

Chart performance
"World in Your Hands" was a hit in most of the European countries where it was released, but it didn't reach the same level of success as the previous singles of the band. However, it entered the top 10 in both Finland and the Netherlands, reaching number four and ten, respectively. Additionally, the single was a top 20 hit in Ireland (13), Denmark (16), Germany (18), and the United Kingdom. In the latter, it reached number 20 in its first week at the UK Singles Chart, on 27 March 1994. On the UK Dance Singles Chart, it fared better, peaking at number 17. On the Eurochart Hot 100, "World in Your Hands" peaked at number 25 in May 1994. Outside Europe, the song reached number 37 in New Zealand and number 57 in Australia.

Music video
The accompanying music video of "World in Your Hands" was directed by Swedish-based director Matt Broadley. It was A-listed on Germany's VIVA in April 1994. Broadley had previously directed the videos for the group's earlier singles, "Mr. Vain" and "Anything".

Track listings

 7-inch, Europe (1994)
 "World in Your Hands" (Radio Edit) – 4:10
 "World in Your Hands" (Tribal Mix) – 6:52

 12-inch, Germany (1994)
 "World in Your Hands" (Tribal Mix) – 6:52
 "World in Your Hands" (Groovy Mix) – 7:27
 "Anything" (Trancemix) – 6:30
 "World in Your Hands" (Radio Edit) – 4:10

 CD single, UK and Europe (1994)
 "World in Your Hands" (Radio Edit) – 4:10
 "World in Your Hands" (Tribal Mix) – 6:58
 "World in Your Hands" (Extended Album Version) – 7:24
 "Anything" (Trance Mix) – 6:30

 CD maxi-single, Europe (1994)
 "World in Your Hands" (Radio Edit) – 4:11
 "World in Your Hands" (Tribal Mix) – 6:56
 "World in Your Hands" (Extended Version) – 7:32
 "World in Your Hands" (Extended Album Version) – 7:23

 CD maxi-single, Australia (1994)
 "World in Your Hands" (Radio Edit) – 4:10
 "World in Your Hands" (Tribal Mix) – 6:52
 "World in Your Hands" (Groovy Mix) – 7:27
 "World in Your Hands" (Extended Version) – 7:32
 "World in Your Hands" (Extended Album Version) – 7:23

 CD maxi-single - Remix, Europe (1994)
 "World in Your Hands" (MKM's Danish Flex Mix) – 6:23
 "World in Your Hands" (M.S. Dance-Mix) – 6:11
 "World in Your Hands" (Club In Trance-Mix) – 7:08
 "World in Your Hands" (Not Normal Mix) – 7:35

Charts

Weekly charts

Year-end charts

References

1990s ballads
1993 songs
1994 singles
Culture Beat songs
Dance Pool singles
English-language German songs
Music videos directed by Matt Broadley
Songs written by Jay Supreme
Songs written by Nosie Katzmann
Songs written by Torsten Fenslau